John I. "Hans" Gilderbloom is a Dutch American community organizer, academic, author, and researcher. He works as an international consultant on creating livable neighborhoods and cities, owns a real estate company that renovates historic housing, and is a professor of urban and public affairs at the University of Louisville. In 2014 he was nominated as a Fellow of the Scholars Strategy Network housed at Harvard University. He has been ranked as one of the "top 100 urban thinkers in the world."

Early life and education

John Gilderbloom was born in San Mateo, California to parents Murray Edward and Jeanette Lauder Gilderbloom (Dutch Gelderblom). He grew up in San Francisco in a creative environment of writers and musicians. His godfather was Dave Lewis, a Stanford University writing professor who was the co-author of Klute, which won an Academy Award for Best Picture in 1970. Mark Dowie, former publisher and editor of Mother Jones was a frequent Sunday guest for family meals. His uncle Clarence W. Gilderbloom was a respected inventor involved in developing patents for early versions of the dishwasher and a motorized Lazy Boy recliner. Another influential relative, Gilderbloom's distant aunt Hanneke Gelderblom, was known as "the Anne Frank that lived" and was featured in the documentary Sex, Drugs, and Democracy. She was elected a Senator in the Netherlands and worked at the International Court of Justice.

Dr. Gilderbloom received his B.A. (1975), M.A. (1978), and Ph.D. (1983) in Sociology from the University of California, Santa Barbara. He graduated with the highest GPA in his graduating class (1975) with a straight A average. While at UCSB he took classes from and was mentored by Harvey Molotch, Richard Appelbaum, and took classes from David Harvey (who stayed with him while teaching at UCSB), Christopher Jencks, W. Dennis Keating, Michael Teitz, Jürgen Habermas, Roger Friedland, William Bielby, and William Domhoff.

Community organizer

In the 1970s Dr. Gilderbloom organized several local, state and national tenant organizations including the California Housing Action and Information Network to help pass rent control laws and other tenant protections. The Foundation for National Progress (Mother Jones) published an organizing manual, Rent Control: A Source Book which was adopted by the emerging tenant movement in the 1980s. Orange County's The Register called it the "Bible" of the rent control movement and it received both praise and attacks from The Nation, The New York Times, and The Wall Street Journal. He later published a book, Community Versus Commodity:  Tenants and the American City on the renters movement with Stella Capek.

Gilderbloom himself has experienced the landlords' wrath.  He was advised to halt his study several times. "You'll never survive to finish your work," one industry lobbyist warned him.  In another instance, a real estate agent wrote one of the  Governor's aides that: "We must find a way to neutralize him [Gilderbloom]."

Today, 10% of the nation's renters are covered by some form of rent control, including these cities Dr. Gilderbloom advocated in: San Francisco, Los Angeles, Berkeley, West Hollywood, and Santa Monica and another 103 cities in New Jersey.

Dr. Gilderbloom interned with Governor Jerry Brown and advocated for the governor to veto legislation prohibiting rent regulations. He later would veto this legislation in the California State Assembly.

Similarly, Dr. Gilderbloom worked with Mitch Snyder, founder of the National Coalition for the Homeless, to block President Ronald Reagan from prohibiting federal funds to cities who have enacted rent control. He co-authored a study demonstrating that rent control was not correlated with increases in the homeless population, refuting William Tucker's research. President Reagan's proposal was defeated in Congress.

Later Dr. Gilderbloom began work in poor neighborhoods to develop affordable, accessible, and attractive housing. He writes about his struggles in Promise and Betrayal: Universities and the Battle for Sustainable Urban Neighborhoods.

Academic career

Dr. Gilderbloom is a professor in the Department of Urban and Public Affairs at University of Louisville and director at the Center for Sustainable Urban Neighborhoods. His research interests include "[r]esearch methods, statistics, housing, community development, planning and design." Dr. Gilderbloom is also the Director of the Center for Sustainable Urban Neighborhoods, a research center in the Urban Studies Institute at University of Louisville that explores ways to create more sustainable communities. He is a frequent collaborate with Dr. William (Billy) Riggs from University of San Francisco.

Dr. Gilderbloom has written and edited five books and countless articles on issues concerning rental housing, poverty, health, community development, and urban policy. His work includes, "50 peer reviewed publications (including several in Journal of Urban Affairs), 30 book chapters, eight authored or co-authored books or journals, and [...] op-ed pieces in Wall Street Journal, Washington Post, Los Angeles Times, Chicago Sun-Times, USA Today Magazine, Governing Magazine, American Banker, Courier Journal, and many other outlets." His book Rethinking Rental Housing was called "[T]he most significant piece on housing policy written in the last 40 years" by Daniel Lauber, past President of the American Planning Association. A National Housing Institute Survey of Books in Housing Courses found Rethinking Rental Housing to be the most widely chosen book in college housing courses. He later updated the book with new chapters and new numbers called:  Invisible City:  Housing, Poverty, and New Urbanism.
Additionally, Dr. Gilderbloom contributed a chapter on modern Cuban architecture for the Encyclopedia of 20th-Century Architecture which won Planetizen's top ten best books in  planning for 2005 and a chapter on the history of rent strikes for the Encyclopedia of Housing, 2nd edition, which won best reference book award from American Library Association. Dr. Gilderbloom has been consulted by several countries for his work, including Russia, Cuba, Venezuela, Mexico, the Netherlands, and Spain.

Other work

Clinton Administration
Dr. Gilderbloom consulted with the Clinton Administration on "Clinton's first State of the Union Speech" and "Section 108 programs, Hope VI, and Community Outreach Partnership Programs." He was recognized for his "extraordinary service to the President's Council on Sustainable Development" for his research.

Neighborhood revitalization

Dr. Gilderbloom runs a successful consulting business and has contributed his expertise on numerous neighborhood revitalization projects in West Louisville, Newport (KY), Covington (KY), and Southern Indiana worth over $100 million. His work has been featured in The New York Times. The East Russel Partnership, a collaboration between local organizations; city, state, and federal government; and the Center for Sustainable Urban Neighborhoods received the Sierra Club's Best Practices Award, given for smart growth projects for their success in West Louisville. He has also worked with cities to produce "green housing developments" in Louisville, Indianapolis, Muncie, IN; Covington, KY; and Newport, KY.

Real estate

Dr. Gilderbloom has restored 10 historic homes as a part of his business, one of which has been featured in The New York Times and been the set of the movie The Song. His homes are restored using principles of green design.

Recognitions and achievements

Dr. Gilderbloom's research has earned him numerous awards and recognitions throughout his career. His largest recognition was an international survey of planners and city officials of the  Top 100 Urban Thinkers poll conducted by Planetizen, where he was ranked as 63 (placing him in the top forty for living urban thinkers). Additionally, he was chosen as one of the select few academics to be a commentator in Politico's "Arena." He was awarded by the University of Louisville the Presidential Medal for Distinguished Faculty in Research and Creative Activity (2013). In 1997 he was awarded honorary membership in the Phi Kappa Phi for his "outstanding research and character".

In 1982 Dr. Gilderbloom received the American Planning Association Chapter Award for Outstanding Contribution to Planning for his research on inter-city rent differentials and housing policy analysis. A year later in 1983, Dr. Gilderbloom received the Douglas A. McGregor Memorial Award for Outstanding Social Science from the Journal of Applied Behavioral Science for his research paper "Housing Supply and Regulation: A Study of Rental Housing Market", co-written with Dr. Richard Appelbaum.

His work on rent control includes two books, eight scholarly articles, and numerous op-eds in publications including The Wall Street Journal and The Los Angeles Times, making him one of the most outspoken scholars on rent control.

In the summer of 2015, Dr. Gilderbloom was invited to speak on behalf of his work at the Strelka Institute in Moscow, Russia.

Selected publications

Chromatic Homes: The Joy of Color in Historic Places (written by John I. "Hans" Gilderbloom. 2018. University Press of Kentucky)
Chromatic Homes: A Design & Coloring Book (John I. "Hans" Gilderbloom. 2019. University Press of Kentucky) 
Invisible City: Housing, Poverty and New Urbanism (written by John I. Gilderbloom. 2008. Austin, TX: University of Texas Press)
 Promise and Betrayal: The University and the Battle for Sustainable Urban Neighborhoods. 2008. Albany, New York: State University New York Press)
 Community Versus Commodity: Tenants and the American City (written by Stella Capek and John I. Gilderbloom. Albany: SUNY Press)
 Rethinking Rental Housing (written by John I. Gilderbloom and Richard Appelbaum. 1988. Philadelphia: Temple University Press)
 Rent Control: A Source Book (edited by John I. Gilderbloom. 1981. San Francisco: Foundation for National Progress, Housing Information Center)

References

1952 births
University of Louisville faculty
University of California, Santa Barbara alumni
Living people
People from San Mateo, California
Writers from Louisville, Kentucky
Sustainable transport pioneers